The Institute of High Energy Physics of the Chinese Academy of Sciences (IHEP) is the largest and most comprehensive fundamental research center of high-energy physics in China. It is located in Shijingshan District, Beijing and administered by the Chinese Academy of Sciences. The major research fields of IHEP are particle physics, astrophysics and astroparticle physics, accelerator physics and technologies, radiation technologies, and their applications.

Related
 Beijing Electron-Positron Collider (BEPC and BEPCII)
 Beijing Proton Linac (BPL)
 Beijing Spectrometer III (BES III)
 Beijing Synchrotron Radiation Facility
 Beijing Test Beam Facility
 China Spallation Neutron Source
 Dark Matter Particle Explorer (DAMPE)
 Daya Bay Reactor Neutrino Experiment
 Hard X-ray Modulation Telescope (HXMT)
 High Energy cosmic Radiation Detector facility (HERD)
 Jiangmen Underground Neutrino Observatory (JUNO)
 Large High Altitude Air Shower Observatory (LHAASO)
 POLAR instrument onboard Tiangong-2
 Yangbajing International Cosmic Ray Observatory (YBJ)
 Yutu (rover); IHEP built its alpha particle X-ray spectrometer

References 

Particle accelerators
Particle physics facilities
Research institutes of the Chinese Academy of Sciences
Shijingshan District
Physics institutes